"Horse" is a single by Swedish DJ Salvatore Ganacci. American record label Owsla released the single along with a music video on 17 April 2019. The music video was nominated for and won a Grammis for Music Video of the Year in 2020.

Music video
A music video for "Horse" was released on 19 April 2019. The video was directed by Vedran Rupic. Ganacci described the video as a message of love.

Reception
DJ Mag praised "Horse" for its high energy and the outlandish nature of the music video. EDMSauce also enjoyed the weird nature, adding a moral to the video relating to animal cruelty. Chris Stack of Dancing Astronaut also enjoyed the single, writing that listeners would be reminded of other dance songs from the 1990s. EDM.com simply headlined the video with a "can't unwatch" impact.

Awards and nominations

References

2019 songs
2019 singles
House music songs
Owsla singles